John Martin Lindström (born 22 August 1980) is a Swedish singer and songwriter. He is best known for his collaborations with the Swedish House Mafia. Since 2010, he has collaborated with Tinie Tempah and released his debut single "Anywhere For You", written alongside music partner Michel Zitron. On 3 April 2014 Lindström appeared on the BBC Radio 1 Live Lounge covering Haim's "If I Could Change Your Mind".

Early life
Raised in the southern suburbs of Stockholm, with his mother, father, and older brother, his father encouraged him and his brother to pursue motorsport, but Martin and his brother turned to music instead. At 13, Martin bought a guitar, formed a band, and began playing Nirvana covers. Martin began singing at 15 when the band's singer quit right before a show, and he decided that he liked it. He performed in various musical venues in his hometown.

Music career

2010–12: Breakthrough with Swedish House Mafia
In 2010, John Martin was discovered by Swedish House Mafia member Axwell. He recorded the vocals for and co-wrote the group's 2011 song, "Save the World". The song reached No. 10 in the UK singles chart and peaked at No. 1 on the Hot Dance Club Songs in the United States. In 2012, Martin went on to collaborate with Avicii and co-wrote the song, "Fade Into Darkness", alongside Michel Zitron. Later in the year he  recorded another song with the Swedish House Mafia, which he and Zitron also co-wrote called "Don't You Worry Child". The track scored Martin's first UK No. 1 single, and also earned Martin and the trio a top 10 spot on the Billboard Hot 100, peaking at number 6.

2013: Collaborations
In 2013, Martin and Swedish House Mafia were nominated for a Grammy for Best Dance Recording with "Don't You Worry Child" for the 2013 Grammy Awards. He was nominated alongside Calvin Harris and Ne-Yo, Skrillex, Avicii and Al Walser with the award going to Skrillex. 2013 also saw John Martin record vocals for Sebastian Ingrosso and Tommy Trash's single "Reload", in addition to providing guest vocal for Tinie Tempah's single "Children of the Sun" which again was co-written by Martin. Trevor Guthrie had also been asked to feature on the song however John's vocals were deemed stronger.

2014–2015: Debut lead singles
Martin released his debut lead single, "Anywhere For You", on 30 March 2014. The song became a UK top 10 hit, and certified platinum in Sweden. Martin's second single, "Love Louder", was premiered in the summer of that year. The song, originally thought to be a David Guetta track which missed out on his album Listen, saw 
release on 1 September under the credits "Love Louder (Style of Eye remix)".

2015 saw a very quiet release program for John Martin. His first track came from providing uncredited vocals to the song "In My Blood" from the album Forever by Swedish DJ and producer Alesso. Martin's second and final 2015 release saw him co-write "Together" with vocalist Ella Eyre. The single, released 17 May, featured on Eyre's 2015 album Feline.

2018: Vcation
On 27 July 2018, John Martin along with Michel Zitron launch a new music project called "Vcation". This was followed by the duo's debut single under this name entitled "Lay Low". Their second single, "When We Went Gold", was released on 21 September 2018. Vcation's first song of 2019 was released on 18 January and was called "Whiskey and Cola".

Discography

Singles

As lead artist

As featured artist

Other appearances

Releases under an alias

As VCATION (with Michel Zitron)

Awards and nominations

Grammy Awards

Grammis Awards

See also
 Popular music in Sweden

Notes
 A  "Anywhere for You" did not chart on the Belgian Flanders Ultratop, but it did chart at number 20 on the Ultratip chart, the top 100 songs which have not made the Ultratop 50.

References

External links
 

Living people
Singers from Stockholm
Swedish songwriters
English-language singers from Sweden
1980 births
21st-century Swedish singers
21st-century Swedish male singers